Alison Rowatt (born 16 February 1981 in Rutherglen) is a female field hockey midfield player from Scotland. She played club hockey for Giffnock, and made her debut for the Women's National Team in 2000.

After retiring from field hockey, she went on to compete in triathlon.

Rowatt works as a lawyer in Edinburgh.

References

1981 births
Living people
Scottish female field hockey players
Field hockey players at the 2006 Commonwealth Games
Sportspeople from Rutherglen
Commonwealth Games competitors for Scotland